The Chho are one of the eleven tribes of the Chin-Kuki-Mizo people, native to Mindat and Kanpalet area in the Chin Hills of Myanmar. They are also known as Sho, Kx'ou, Cho and Yindu.

Demography
The Chho tribe includes the Fanai (Pawi Lusei), Chindui, Yindu, Ngayah, Dai, Moun and Makan tribes. The total population of Chho people in 1973–74 Census is 41,070.

Origin
Like other Mizo tribes, Chho migrated from Tibet to Meythe and Tayet, moving through the Pohpa Hills and the Kabaw Valley. From the Kabaw Valley they shifted southwards to the Yaw Valley and settled in their present location in the southern Chin Hills (Samee, Kanpetlet, Matupi and Mindat township).

Social life
The majority of Chho people are farmers. They usually live on the farm as long as there is work, so they may live in the village for only two or three months out of the year.

Hospitality
The Chho people have always shown hospitality to any guests, even to a complete stranger, without any differences or discrimination. If there is a traveler passing through their village during a storm, a rainy day, or at night, they will invite them to stay, occasionally insisting upon it.

Revenge-Murder
In contrary to their hospitality, murder for the cause of revenge is the strangest tradition they keep. The root cause for this tradition is not known. However, this tradition is not observed in other Mizo people living nearby (the Chinboi, Yindu and Yaw tribes). In 1968, the Burmese government attempted to eradicate this tradition of revenge-murder. In the beginning, the people were afraid their tradition would be completely eradicated, which resulted in higher rate of murder. Till 1973, the murder record was much less than before.

References

Mizo clans